is a Japanese manga series written and illustrated by Wataru Midori. It was serialized in Shogakukan's seinen manga magazine Weekly Big Comic Spirits from October 2019 to November 2020, with its chapters collected in five tankōbon volumes.

Publication
Written and illustrated by Wataru Midori, Run on Your New Legs was serialized in Shogakukan's seinen manga magazine Weekly Big Comic Spirits from October 28, 2019, to November 16, 2020. Shogakukan collected its chapters in five tankōbon volumes, released from February 28, 2020, to December 25, 2020.

In North America, the manga was licensed for English release by Yen Press. The first volume was released on March 22, 2022.

Volume list

References

External links
 

Amputees in fiction
Prosthetics in fiction
Seinen manga
Shogakukan manga
Sports anime and manga
Yen Press titles